Mohkam may refer to:

 Mohkam Singh (1663–1705), one of the Five Beloved of honoured memory in the Sikh tradition
 Al-Muḥkam wa-al-muḥīt al-aʻẓam, a medieval Arabic dictionary